The Mytilinidiaceae are a family of fungi in the order Mytilinidiales. Taxa in the family are widely distributed, particularly in temperate zones, and are usually saprobic on woody tissue, especially gymnosperms.

References

Mytilinidiales
Dothideomycetes families